This is a list of video games and other apps for the Oculus Quest, Oculus/Meta Quest 2, and Meta Quest Pro virtual reality headsets. Video games and apps required to be sideloaded are not included in this list. Listed release date is the date released on the Quest platform, games may have been previously released on other platforms. There are currently  games on this list.

Meta Quest

Quest Multiplayer

App Lab  

App Lab is a section of the Meta Quest store for games that are experimental, early in development, or have not passed the full review process.

In development 

These games have been announced and are in development right now.

See also

 List of Oculus Rift games
 List of HTC Vive games
 List of PlayStation VR games

References

External links
 Oculus Quest Experiences: Oculus' software store

Oculus Quest
Oculus Quest